This is a list of unconfirmed exoplanets discovered or detected by the NASA Kepler mission (Kepler Candidates from the NASA Exoplanet Archive) that are potentially habitable. Those already confirmed are listed by their Kepler names in the list of potentially habitable exoplanets, and the data may differ when the planets are confirmed. Masses for a pure iron, rocky, and water composition are given for comparison purposes.

The planet candidate KOI-4878.01 could be one of the most Earth-like known planets in terms of size and stellar flux.

See also 

 List of potentially habitable exoplanets

References

K